Raúl Alberto Osella (born 8 June 1984 in Morteros) is an Argentine association footballer who currently plays for FC Locarno in Swiss Challenge League. He played FIFA U-17 World Cup Final for Argentina national team 2001. He played for Boca Juniors and Tiro Federal in Argentina.

He also holds Italian passport.

References

External links
Football.ch profile  
FC Locarno profile  

Profile at BDFA.com.ar

1984 births
Living people
Argentine expatriate sportspeople in Italy
Argentine expatriate sportspeople in Switzerland
Argentine people of Italian descent
Sportspeople from Córdoba Province, Argentina
Argentine footballers
Argentine expatriate footballers
Expatriate footballers in Switzerland
Boca Juniors footballers
Tiro Federal footballers
FC Locarno players
Argentine Primera División players
Association football defenders
Citizens of Italy through descent
Italian people of Argentine descent